The New Mexico History Museum is a history museum in Santa Fe, New Mexico. It is part of the state-run Museum of New Mexico system operated by the New Mexico Department of Cultural Affairs. Opened in 2009, the museum houses  of permanent and rotating exhibits covering the history of New Mexico from ancient Native American cultures to the present.

The museum was built after the Museum of New Mexico's collection of historic artifacts had outgrown its previous home at the 400-year-old Palace of the Governors. The new $44 million museum opened to the public on May 24, 2009, receiving more than 10,000 visitors on its first day. It holds around 20,000 artifacts. 

The New Mexico History Museum   has 3 1/2 floors of exhibitions telling the stories that made the American West, from the early lives of Native people to Spanish colonists. During the brutal conflict, 501 New Mexicans lost their lives. The museum has a section for the Fray Angélico Chávez History Library and Photo Archives.  It also has the Palace Print Shop & Bindery, and the Native American Artisans Program. In 2018 New Mexico History Museum opened an exhibit, "The First World War", on the 100th anniversary of Armistice.

Facilities
In addition to the main building, the museum campus includes the following facilities:
Palace of the Governors
Fray Angélico Chávez History Library
Palace Press
Photo Archives

References
6. https://www.newmexicoculture.org/museums/history-museum/

https://www.santafenewmexican.com/pasatiempo/art/exhibitionism/the-first-world-war-at-the-new-mexico-history-museum/article_c381f5ba-576f-11ec-a332-974f8ac58338.html

Museums in Santa Fe, New Mexico
History museums in New Mexico
Buildings and structures completed in 2009
Museums established in 2009
2009 establishments in New Mexico
Native American history of New Mexico